Gerard Friedrich "Gerrie" Knetemann (6 March 1951 in Amsterdam – 2 November 2004 in Bergen, North Holland) was a Dutch road bicycle racer who won the 1978 World Championship. He wore the Yellow Jersey early in each Tour de France for four consecutive years between 1977 and 1980.

A four-time winner of the Ronde van Nederland, he also rode the Tour de France 11 times between 1974 and 1987, winning 10 stages, a Dutch record equalled only by Jan Raas and Joop Zoetemelk. Knetemann won 127 races as a professional.

Knetemann maintained an Amsterdam accent and a sharp sense of humour that made him a favourite with reporters and earned him television and radio appearances. His best year in the Tour de France was 1978, when he led from the sixth stage. Although he lost the leader's yellow jersey two days later, he won the stage into Lausanne and then the final stage on the Champs Elysées in Paris.

Together with Raas and his TI-Raleigh teammates Knetemann played a pivotal role in the victory of Zoetemelk in the 1980 Tour de France, one of the most dominating team performances in Tour de France history in which the team won twelve stages.

His career dwindled after a crash in Dwars door België in Belgium in March 1983. Recovery took months and, although he did again ride the Tour de France, there was not much left of the once sparkling star. Knetemann did however win the Amstel Gold Race in 1985. He retired from racing in 1991 and became Dutch team selector.

Knetemann died while riding his bike. He collapsed from a heart attack with friends in Bergen.

His wife, Gre Donker, was also a racing cyclist. They had a son and two daughters. Their daughter Roxane, born in 1987, was a professional cyclist as well.

Teams 

Knetemann raced for several different sponsored teams in his career, one of the most famous was the  team, managed by Peter Post, with which he won the 1978 UCI Road World Championships.

Career achievements

Major results

1971
1st Stage 3 Olympia's Tour
1974
1st Amstel Gold Race
1975
1st Stage 12 Tour de France
1st Stage 3 Tour de Romandie
2nd Overall Tour de Picardie
1st Prologue
1976
1st Stage 5a (TTT) Tour de France
1st Overall Vuelta a Andalucía
1st Stage 1a
1st Stage 7a
1st Overall Ronde van Nederland
1st Stage 4
1st Trofeo Zumaquero
1977
1st Stage 19 Tour de France
1st Stage 21 Tour de France
1st Overall Four Days of Dunkirk
1st Stage 3 Paris–Nice
1st Stage 6b Paris–Nice
1st Eschborn-Frankfurt City Loop
1978
  World Road Race Champion
 1st Stage 4 (TTT) Tour de France
 1st Stage 18 Tour de France
 1st Stage 22 Tour de France
1st Overall Paris–Nice
1st Stage 1
1st Stage 2
1st Stage 7b
1st Overall Tour Méditerranéen
1st Stage 4b
1st Stage 5a Ronde van Nederland
1st Prologue Tour de Suisse
1st Grand Prix Pino Cerami
1st Ronde van Midden-Zeeland
1979
 1st Prologue Tour de France
 1st Stage 4 (TTT) Tour de France
 1st Stage 8 (TTT) Tour de France
 1st Stage 22 Tour de France
2nd Overall Ronde van Nederland
1st Stage 1
3rd Overall Paris–Nice
1st Prologue
1st Prologue Tour de Suisse
1st Stage 3a Tour de Suisse
1st Stage 6 Tour de Suisse
1st Stage 9b Tour de Suisse
1980
 1st Stage 1b (TTT) Tour de France
 1st Stage 7a (TTT) Tour de France
 1st Stage 12 Tour de France
1st Overall Ronde van Nederland
1st Overall Tour Méditerranéen
1st Prologue (victory shared with Jan Raas)
3rd Overall Paris–Nice
1st Prologue
1st Stage 7b
1st Overall Tour of Belgium
1st Ronde van Midden-Zeeland
1981
 1st Stage 1b (TTT) Tour de France
 1st Stage 4 (TTT) Tour de France
1st Overall Ronde van Nederland
1st Stage 2b
1st Stage 5b Tour de Romandie
1st Nokere Koerse
1982
 1st Stage 4 Tour de France
 1st Stage 9a (TTT) Tour de France
 1st Stage 11 Tour de France
2nd Overall Tirreno–Adriatico
1st Prologue
1st Stage 4
1st Overall Three Days of De Panne
1st Stage 1b
1983
1st Overall Tour Méditerranéen
1st Stage 4b
GP de Costières du Gard
1984
1st Prologue Vuelta a Andalucía
1st Stage 5b Vuelta a Andalucía
1st Prologue Volta a la Comunitat Valenciana
Grand Prix Pino Cerami
1985
1st Amstel Gold Race
1986
1st Overall Ronde van Nederland
1st Stage 4b
1st Stage 2 Tour de Suisse
1987
1st Overall Tour of Sweden

See also 
 List of Dutch cyclists who have led the Tour de France general classification

External links 
Knetemann's death on Cyclingnews.com

1951 births
2004 deaths
Dutch male cyclists
Dutch Tour de France stage winners
Cyclists from Amsterdam
Tour de France Champs Elysées stage winners
Tour de France prologue winners
UCI Road World Champions (elite men)
Tour de Suisse stage winners
UCI Road World Championships cyclists for the Netherlands